The official names of the Soviet Union, officially known as the Union of Soviet Socialist Republics, in the languages of the Soviet Republics (presented in the constitutional order) and other languages of the USSR, were as follows.

USSR official languages

Other languages

References

Soviet Union
Geography of the Soviet Union